Mikuni may refer to:

 Mikuni, Fukui, a town located in Sakai District, Fukui, Japan
 Mount Mikuni (disambiguation)
, Japanese pop singer
, Japanese actor
 Mikuni (company), a Japanese corporation
 Mikuni Awara Line, a railway line operated by Echizen Railway in Fukui Prefecture
 Mikuni Kaidō, an ancient highway in Japan

Japanese-language surnames
Japanese masculine given names